Never summer may refer to:
 Never Summer Snowboard Company
 Never Summer Mountains